Out of Reach is the ninth studio album by the German krautrock band Can, released as an LP in 1978 on Harvest Records. It is their tenth official studio album, discounting compilations such as Unlimited Edition.

Context
The band's previous album Saw Delight was the first to include former Traffic members Rosko Gee and Rebop Kwaku Baah. Founding bassist and producer Holger Czukay was reduced to the position of making electronic sounds as Gee took over the bass duties. Czukay left the band during the recording sessions for what was to become Out of Reach.

Style
As a partial result of Czukay's departure, the new members are said to dominate the group's sound on this album (or "to impose too strict a sense of rhythm on Can's once free-flowing music", according to an interview). Critically acclaimed drummer Jaki Liebezeit's beats are greatly reduced in their power in relation to Baah's percussion. However, the album's strong guitar solos from Michael Karoli are a link to the older Can sound, and have drawn comparisons to those of Carlos Santana. Gee has also been praised as creating a jazz sound, but equally Out of Reach has been criticized for delving into a disco style.

Music
Rosko Gee takes lead vocals on "Pauper's Daughter and I" (quoting the "Jack and Jill" nursery rhyme) and "Give Me No 'Roses'", and is credited with writing these two tracks, although according to a 1997 interview with the band in Mojo magazine, this lack of collaboration with the rest of the group was a sign that the band was about to collapse. Rebop sings on the track "Like INOBE GOD", which has been called Can's worst-ever recorded piece.

The four other songs ("Serpentine", "November", "Seven Days Awake" and "One More Day") are instrumental. A simpler version of November was called "Mighty Girl" in the 1975 session for BBC's John Peel Show.

Reissued versions
Out of Reach has variously been reissued as a double CD with Can's 1979 self-titled release Can (also known as Inner Space after the band's recording studio) and on its own in several single CD versions, e.g. on MagMid (TKO Magnum Music) in the United Kingdom, but was more difficult to find than other Can albums. Being the only Can album that features no input from Holger Czukay (its followup Can had some editing by Czukay), it was disowned by the band for many years - hence its rather haphazard reissue history - and was not listed as part of their discography on their official website. It was not issued either as part of Spoon Records' first CD reissues of most of their albums in 1989, nor in a remastered Super Audio CD edition in 2006 unlike all the other Can studio albums.
It was finally officially re-issued by Spoon Records, in CD, vinyl and digital formats, on 18 August 2014.

Track listing

Personnel

Musicians
According to the liner notes:
Can
Jaki Liebezeit - drums
Michael Karoli - guitars, violins on "Roses"
Irmin Schmidt - piano, keyboards, Alpha 77
Rosko Gee - bass, vocal and words on "Roses" and "Pauper's Daughter and I", Fender piano on "Roses", flangbass on "Seven Days Awake" and "Serpentine"
Rebop Kwaku Baah - percussion, Polymoog on "Roses", voice, word melody on "Like Inobe God"

Other personnel
René Tinner - recording engineer
Conny Plank - mixing
Hildegard Schmidt - manager
A. Backhausen - photography, cover design

Notes and references

Notes

Citations

1978 albums
Can (band) albums
Harvest Records albums